Flatmates is a New Zealand reality show. It followed the lives of several house friends while they were living under the same roof. The show was broadcast on the now-defunct channel TV4 in 1997 and ran for two seasons with the follow up, More Flatmates. The show was produced by Top Shelf Productions and funded by NZ On Air. The show was a finalist for the New Zealand television awards in 1998.

References

External links 
 

1997 New Zealand television series debuts
1990s New Zealand television series
New Zealand reality television series
Four (New Zealand TV channel) original programming
Television shows funded by NZ on Air